Mesembrinellinae is a subfamily of Neotropical flies in the order Diptera, and formerly included in the Calliphoridae. There are 33 described living species.

Taxonomy
Albuquerquea Mello, 1967
A. latifrons Mello, 1967
Eumesembrinella Townsend, 1931
E. benoisti (Séguy, 1925)
E. cyaneicincta (Surcouf, 1919)
E. quadrilineata (Fabricius, 1805)
E. randa (Walker, 1849)
Giovanella Bonatto and Marinoni, 2005
G. bolivar Bonatto and Marinoni, 2005
G. carvalhoi Wolff et al., 2013
Henriquella Bonatto and Marinon, 2005
H. spicata (Aldrich, 1925)
Huascaromusca Townsend, 1931
H. aeneiventris (Wiedemann, 1830)
H. bequaerti (Séguy, 1925)
H. decrepita (Séguy, 1925)
H. lara Bonatto and Marinoni, 2005
H. purpurata (Aldrich, 1922)
H. semiflava (Aldrich, 1925)
H. uniseta (Aldrich, 1925)
H. vogelsangi Mello, 1967
Mesembrinella Giglio-Tos, 1893
M. abaca (Hall, 1948)
M. apollinaris Séguy, 1925
M. batesi Aldrich, 1922
M. bellardiana Aldrich, 1922
M. bicolor (Fabricius, 1805)
M. brunnipes Surcouf, 1919
†M. caenozoica Cerretti et al, 2017
M. currani Guimarães, 1977
M. flavicrura Aldrich, 1925
M. patriciae Wolff, 2013
M. peregrina Aldrich, 1922
M. pictipennis Aldrich, 1922
M. semihyalina Mello, 1967
M. townsendi Guimarães, 1977
M. umbrosa Aldrich, 1922
M. xanthorrina (Bigot, 1887)
Thompsoniella Guimarães, 1977
T. andina Wolff et al., 2014
T. anomala Guimarães, 1977

References

Mesembrinellidae
Brachycera subfamilies